stands at the boundary of Tokyo, Saitama, and Yamanashi Prefectures on the island of Honshū, Japan. It separates the Okutama Mountains and the Okuchichibu Mountains. While it marks the end of the Ishione (石尾根) mountain ridge that begins near the JR Oku-Tama Station, the highest mountain ridge in Tokyo, its remote location amongst a group of mountains from both mountain ranges makes access difficult.

Kumotori-san features an "emergency" hut sometimes used by hikers as overnight shelter. Hikers not used to the altitude (if coming from Tokyo) may prefer overnighting at a lower elevation. The top of Kumotori-san, in good weather, offers a splendid view of Mount Fuji.

The prominence of the mountain in the region resulted in its summit being established as a fixed first-class triangulation point. As the triangulation point was established in December 1882, this was also one of the earliest ones established in Japan.

Kumotori is one of the 100 Famous Mountains of Japan.

See also
 Okutama
 Okuchichibu Mountains
 List of the 100 famous mountains in Japan

References

External links
 
 Geospatial Information Authority of Japan's Topographic map 

Kumotori
Kumotori
Kumotori
Western Tokyo